Helen Clarke may refer to:

Helen Clarke (field hockey) (born 1971), New Zealand field hockey player
Helen A. Clarke (1860–1926), American literary critic and editor
Helen P. Clarke (1846–1923), American actress and bureaucrat

See also
Helen Clark (disambiguation)